Dalzell is a census-designated place (CDP) in Sumter County, South Carolina, United States. The population was 3,175 at the 2020 census. It is included in the Sumter, South Carolina Metropolitan Statistical Area.

History
Orange Grove and St. Philip's Episcopal Church, Bradford Springs are listed on the National Register of Historic Places.

Geography
Dalzell is located at  (34.019811, -80.429780).

Demographics

As of the census of 2000, there were 2,260 people, 805 households, and 622 families residing in the CDP. The population density was 329.7 people per square mile (127.4/km2). There were 895 housing units at an average density of 130.6/sq mi (50.4/km2). The racial makeup of the CDP was 61.11% Caucasian, 33.98% African American, 0.53% Native American, 1.11% Asian, 0.04% Pacific Islander, 1.46% from other races, and 1.77% from two or more races. Hispanic or Latino of any race were 3.27% of the population.

There were 805 households, out of which 45.1% had children under the age of 18 living with them, 56.0% were married couples living together, 16.4% had a female householder with no husband present, and 22.7% were non-families. 19.1% of all households were made up of individuals, and 5.1% had someone living alone who was 65 years of age or older. The average household size was 2.81 and the average family size was 3.20.

In the CDP, the population was spread out, with 32.5% under the age of 18, 8.9% from 18 to 24, 34.5% from 25 to 44, 17.7% from 45 to 64, and 6.5% who were 65 years of age or older. The median age was 30 years. For every 100 females, there were 94.8 males. For every 100 females age 18 and over, there were 91.9 males.

The median income for a household in the CDP was $40,750, and the median income for a family was $41,979. Males had a median income of $29,006 versus $22,000 for females. The per capita income for the CDP was $15,124. About 12.0% of families and 14.9% of the population were below the poverty line, including 24.3% of those under age 18 and 4.0% of those age 65 or over.

Education
All areas in the county are in the Sumter County Consolidated School District.

Notable people
 Joseph (Jusef Ben Ali) Benenhaley (1753-1823) was the progenitor of the Turkish Community of Sumter, a singular ethnic group.
Bill Pinkney - American singer and original member of The Drifters most known for his rendition of "White Christmas."
Ray Allen - NBA player and NBA champion in 2008 with the Boston Celtics. On February 10, 2011, he became the NBA's all-time leader in three-point field goals, passing Reggie Miller. Steph Curry has since passed both Ray Allen and Reggie Miller.
Ja Morant - All Star Guard for the Memphis Grizzlies, selected as the second overall pick in the 2019 NBA Draft.

References

Census-designated places in Sumter County, South Carolina
Census-designated places in South Carolina
Turkish American